The Vacuum Tower Telescope is an evacuated-optics solar telescope located at the Teide Observatory on Tenerife in the Canary Islands.  It is operated by the Kiepenheuer-Institut für Sonnenphysik (KIS). 

It was built between 1983 and 1986, with first light in 1988. Thanks to an adaptive optics system KAOS (Kiepenheuer-institute Adaptive Optic System), in operation since spring 2000, it is able to resolve details down to 0.2 arc seconds (150 km) on the Sun's surface.

Description
The VTT and the GREGOR are operated by four German institutes: the Astrophysikalisches Institut Potsdam, the Kiepenheuer-Institut für Sonnenphysik (Freiburg, chair), the Max-Planck-Institut für Sonnensystemforschung (Lindau), and the Universitäts-Sternwarte Göttingen. The telescope is used for scientific observations from mid April through mid December. Typically 30 to 40 observing campaigns are carried out every year.

History
In the early seventies, the 40cm Newton-telescope, built at the Kiepenheuer-Institut, was installed at the Observatorio del Teide.
In 1982, the Federal Republic of Germany joined the international Agreement on the Cooperation in Astrophysical Research between Spain, Great Britain, Sweden and Denmark. 
Construction work for the German solar telescopes started in 1983, including the Vacuum Tower Telescope (VTT), and the Gregory-Coudé-Telescope (GCT) of the Universitäts-Sternwarte Göttingen. The VTT has been developed at the Kiepenheuer-Institut in Freiburg during the mid seventies. The telescope was installed in 1986 and the scientific operations started in 1988. Since then, the VTT has been constantly improved and has been the ?working horse"" for our researchers. The GCT was put into operation in 1985 and was finally dismantled in 2002, in order to make room for the new 1.5m-telescope GREGOR.

Results
The VTT instrumentation is designed for high-quality measurements of plasma flows and magnetic fields. Some instruments can be combined for simultaneous observations in different parts of the solar spectrum, from the near infrared to the near UV. This possibility is a unique feature for a solar telescope and allows to reveal the three-dimensional structure of the solar atmosphere. With the help of adaptive optics and suitable image reconstruction techniques it is now possible to observe physical properties of small-scale objects on the solar surface with sizes of only 150 km, at the theoretical limit of the telescope. The pictures show a small region of the solar surface with two dark pores. The panel on the right shows how the plasma moves: red is downward motion and blue is upward, the total range is from -1.4 km/s to +1.4 km/s.

See also
 GREGOR Solar Telescope

References

External links
 German Solar Telescopes
 Tenerife German Telescopes: Vacuum Tower Telescope
 
 Telescope Information: Vacuum Tower Telescope

Telescopes
Solar telescopes